Thomas Couch may refer to:

Tom Couch,  Australian football player
Thomas Couch, American professional wrestler known as Tommy Rogers